Gametis is a genus of flower chafer with under 10 species in Asia.

Species in the genus include:
  Gametis andrewesi 
  Gametis bealiae 
  Gametis forticula  
  Gametis histrio 
  Gametis incongrua 
  Gametis jucunda 
  Gametis plagiata 
  Gametis versicolor

References 

Cetoniinae